Netball is played in Antigua and Barbuda.

In Antigua during the 1980s, netball was played during a ten-day celebration that took place in late July and early August.

References

Bibliography

 

Netball
Netball in the Americas by country